Geoffrey de Burgh (1180 – 8 December 1228) was a medieval English cleric who was Archdeacon of Norwich (1200–1225), Bishop of Ely (1215–1219, 1225–1228) and the brother of William de Burgh and Hubert de Burgh, 1st Earl of Kent.

Life
Geoffrey de Burgh was the son of Walter de Burgh of Burgh Castle, Norfolk, and his wife Alice, and the younger brother of William de Burgh and Hubert de Burgh, Earl of Kent. He was born no later than 1180 or so (based on his appointment as archdeacon in 1200). The name of his father is not known, but his mother's name was Alice and the family was from Norfolk and was of knightly status.

Geoffrey was Canon of Salisbury Cathedral and Treasurer of the Exchequer before being named Archdeacon of Norwich (1200). He was elected to the see of Ely (1215), but the election was quashed by Pope Honorius III before May 1219 due to a competing election with Robert of York. The pope quashed both elections, and ordered a new election: the monks chose the Cistercian John (Abbot of Fountains Abbey).

Geoffrey was once more elected to Ely (June 1225). He owed his election to his brother, Hubert (who was Justiciar of England at the time). He was consecrated Bishop of Ely (29 June 1225) and died three years later (between 8 December and 17 December 1228). He was buried in Ely Cathedral in the north choir, though there is no surviving tomb or monument. Besides his brothers, he also had a nephew, Thomas Blunville, who Hubert had elected to the see of Norwich in 1226. 

Roger of Wendover told the story of a Geoffrey, Archdeacon of Norwich, who was a victim of King John of England's cruelty: Geoffrey was thrown into prison and fitted with a lead cloak and starved to death. However, this cannot be Geoffrey de Burgh since the bishop died many years after John's death. The historian Sidney Painter suggested that the real victim may have been another Geoffrey of Norwich, known to be a justice of the Jews.

Arms

See also
House of Burgh, an Anglo-Norman and Hiberno-Norman dynasty founded in 1193
William de Burgh (c.1160–1205/06), Anglo-Irish noble
Hubert de Burgh, 1st Earl of Kent (c.1170–before 1243), Chief Justiciar and Regent of England

Citations

References

 
 
 
 
 
 

Bishops of Ely
13th-century English Roman Catholic bishops
Archdeacons of Norwich
1180s births
1228 deaths
Year of birth uncertain
Geoffrey
English Roman Catholic clergy